Albert John Wellman Fudge (30 January 1858 – 7 November 1949) was a member of the Queensland Legislative Assembly.

Biography
Fudge was born in Yeovil, Somerset, the son of John Wellman Fudge and his wife Sarah (née Northover). He was educated in Yeovil and arrived in Queensland in 1884. He continued the craft he had learned in England as a carpenter until 1895 when he took up a selection of land at Mirani.

On 27 December 1884 he married Naomi Brown (died 1946) and together had three sons and three daughters. Fudge died in November 1949 and his funeral proceeded from the Central Methodist Church in Mackay to the Mackay Cemetery.

Public career
Fudge, representing the Labour Party, won one of the seats in the two-member electorate of Mackay at the 1904 Queensland state election, serving alongside Walter Paget. He did not stand at the following state election held in 1907.

References

Members of the Queensland Legislative Assembly
1858 births
1949 deaths
Australian Labor Party members of the Parliament of Queensland